Vision of God Records is a Christian record label formed by Duane Keith. The label was formed in 2013 in Muskegon, Michigan. The label is primarily known for re-releasing albums with new artwork, mixing and mastering, but they do also have original releases. The label features bands such as Antidemon, Cerimonial Sacred and Demoniciduth. Although based in Michigan, the majority of the bands on the label are either from Brazil (Antidemon, Hazeroth) or the Ukraine (Angel 7, Holy Blood). The label also has an imprint known as Christian Metal Underground Records. The label also distributes Lament Records’ material throughout the United States.

Current Vision of God artists
Antidemon
Adventunnum
Angel 7
Brutal Cross
Cerimonial Sacred
Christ Rising
Demoniciduth
Elgibbor
Endless Sacrifice
Extinction of Baal
Eyes of the Defiled
Golgota
Hating Evil
Hazeroth
Holy Blood
Inflamed
Memorium
Prayer
Spilling the Blood of the Devil
Supresion
They Wither
This Divided World
Thy Christ Eternal

Former Vision of God Records artists
Final Vortex (active)
Hok-Key (active, Box 87')(Hok-key Only did 1 digital release thru VOGR)
Temple of Perdition (active)
Vials of Wrath (active, Independent) Vials Of wrath were never actually signed to VOGR Licensing their 2 releases.

Christian Metal Underground artists

Current
Alstadt
Ascending King
Breviarium
Dark Night
Dawnbreaker
Dehumanize
Gnoma
Imperial Dusk
Mefiboseth
Orationem

Former
And All Shall Bow (Not active)
Armath Sargon (active, White as Snow) (Only 1 release was licensed from Frozen thundra records)
Azar (disbanded/inactive)
Grim (active, Black Metal Underground)
Mashiaj (active)
Pléyades (active)
Primitive Church (active, Resistance)
Pulcro (active)
Satan Decapitated (active, Misterium)
Timōrātus (active)

References

External links

Record labels established in 2012
Record labels based in Michigan
Christian record labels
Heavy metal record labels